Caylloma may refer to:
 Caylloma Province, a province of Peru
 Caylloma District, a district in the Caylloma Province of Peru